F.I.S.T. (stylized on-screen as F•I•S•T) is a 1978 American neo-noir crime drama film directed by Norman Jewison and starring Sylvester Stallone. Stallone plays a Cleveland warehouse worker who becomes involved in the labor union leadership of the fictional "Federation of Inter-State Truckers" (F.I.S.T.). The film is loosely based on the Teamsters Union and their former President Jimmy Hoffa.

Plot
At a loading dock in Cleveland in 1937, supervisor Mr. Gant hires a new worker, Polish American Lincoln Dombrowsky. Gant tells Dombrowsky that he will be paid for his regular shift only even if he must work overtime, and that any merchandise he damages will come directly out of his pay. When Dombrowsky drops a few carts of tomatoes, his pay is docked and another worker is fired for helping him collect the fallen merchandise. Resentful of these unfair labor practices, Hungarian-American worker Johnny Kovak leads a riot. The laborers go to the office of Boss Andrews, where Kovak believes he negotiates a deal for the workers, only to find out the next day that he and his friend Abe Belkin have been fired.

Kovak and Belkin are approached by Mike Monahan, who was impressed by their leadership. He offers them positions in the Federation of Inter State Truckers (F.I.S.T.), where they will be paid according to how many members they can recruit. Kovak is given a car to use while recruiting, which also allows him to meet and soon start dating Lithuanian-American worker Anna Zarinkas. Kovak is successfully recruiting new F.I.S.T. members, which attracts attention from business owners. When Kovak turns down their offer to recruit new workers to their non-union trucking firms, the shady owners have him physically attacked. Kovak rises into a leadership role through his union recruiting, causing competition with hothead F.I.S.T. leader Max Graham.

Soon Monahan, Kovak and Belkin begin working to get the F.I.S.T. members at Consolidated Trucking covered by a labor agreement. When management refuses to deal with them, the F.I.S.T. workers strike. They set up camp outside Consolidated Trucking's gates, but are pushed out by strikebreakers and hired security. Monahan tries to ram the gates in a truck, but is shot and killed. At his funeral, Kovak decides to "get some muscle" and accepts help from Vince Doyle, a local gangster. Doyle's men attack trucks trying to make deliveries. Local mobsters and the members of F.I.S.T. join forces to storm the gates of Consolidated Trucking. The president of Consolidated Trucking finally signs a labor agreement.

Building on this success, Kovak and Belkin travel the Midwest to recruit more workers. Kovak becomes wealthier and marries Anna. A new crime figure, Babe Milano, comes on the scene and wants a piece of the action. Kovak meets Milano with Doyle and, although reluctant to involve him in his business, decides it will be best for now.

By 1957, F.I.S.T. has become a large and important union, with about two million members. When Kovak visits Max Graham at F.I.S.T. headquarters, he is displeased to see how luxurious the building and Graham's offices are. Kovak visits with Belkin, now leading F.I.S.T. business on the West Coast, who explains that Graham has made money unethically off the union. In his investigation, Kovak finds that Graham used his influence to steer union businesses and funds to shell companies owned by him or his wife, and has used violence against the wife of a trucking company owner who resisted the union.

Graham is a strong favorite to be elected F.I.S.T. president. Belkin suggests to Kovak that they turn Graham in to the authorities, but Kovak is too worried about the damage to the union from the scandal. Kovak confronts Graham with what he knows, convincing him to support Kovak's run for union president.

Now the newly elected president of F.I.S.T., Kovak is investigated by Senator Madison, who suspects Kovak of ties with the Mafia through his work with gangsters Doyle and Milano. Belkin urges Kovak to cut off Milano and make the union "clean again", but Kovak ignores his request. When Doyle later tells Kovak that Belkin plans to testify against them, Kovak insists that Belkin not be harmed.

Subpoenaed to testify before Senator Madison's committee, Kovak is told that Belkin has been killed and the senator believes Kovak is responsible. Shocked, Kovak has an emotional outburst and storms out of the hearing. He returns home to find Anna and the children are missing. He gets his pistol but is shot and killed by Milano's men. The movie ends with a shot of a bumper sticker on a truck which reads, "Where's Johnny?"

Cast

Sylvester Stallone as Johnny Kovak
Rod Steiger as Senator Andrew Madison
Peter Boyle as Max Graham
Melinda Dillon as Anna Zarinkas / Anna Kovak
Anthony Kiedis as Kevin Kovak
Tony Mendia as Michael Kovak
David Huffman as Abe Belkin
Kevin Conway as Vince Doyle
Tony Lo Bianco as Anthony "Babe" Milano
Cassie Yates as Molly
Rozsika Halmos as Mrs. Kovak
Elena Karam as Mrs. Zarinkas
Peter Donat as Arthur St. Clair
Frank McRae as Lincoln Dombrowsky
Henry Wilcoxon as Win Talbot
Richard Herd as Mike Monahan
Ken Kercheval as Bernie Marr
James Karen as Mr. Andrews
John Lehne as Mr. Gant
Stuart Gillard as Phil Talbot
Brian Dennehy as Frank Vasko
Nada Rowand as Mrs. Vasko
Deanne Fator as Aggie Vasko
Sam Chew Jr. as Peter Jacobs
Jack Slate as Bob Wilson
James Jeter as Mike Quinn
Ron Delagardelle as Mr. Samuels
Hugo Bolba as Zigi
M. Patrick Hughes as Jocko
Reid Cruickshanks as Mr. McGuinn
Chuck Gradi as "Jugs" Jugovich
Earl Montgomery as Russell Langley
John Bleifer as Mishka
Vincent Williams as Mr. Burke
Bruce McGill as Hitman (uncredited)

Anthony Kiedis, who became the founding lead singer of the band Red Hot Chili Peppers five years later, appeared in a small role using his stage name Cole Dammett, a tribute to the stage name Blackie Dammett used by his actor father.

Production

Development and writing
United Artists hired Joe Eszterhas to write a screenplay about the labor movement in 1974 after studio executive Gene Corman read his articles on the subject in Rolling Stone. Eszterhas, who had never written a screenplay before, wrote a 40-page-essay on the history of labor unions in the American Midwest. Arthur B. Krim hired Norman Jewison in the position of director and offered him a $4 million budget if Jewison could match it with another $4 million. He eventually failed to find another studio to co-finance the film and received a full $8.1 million budget regardless. Eszterhas originally envisioned the role of Kovak with Jack Nicholson (who ironically would later play Jimmy Hoffa, whom Novak was loosely based on in Hoffa), but Sylvester Stallone was cast instead. Sylvester Stallone rewrote Joe Eszterhas' script, saying "Joe Eszterhas wrote a script that was nearly 400 pages and was more of a novel than a shootable screenplay. A great deal of work was done by myself, along with Norman Jewison, to hammer it into shape, but Joe had conceived a great concept."
Eszterhas was reportedly paid $85,000 for the script. Stallone received $350,000 for acting and $150,000 for writing.

Filming

Most of the filming was done in Dubuque, Iowa. Dubuque was chosen firstly because the older sections of the town looked more like Cleveland of the 1930s than Cleveland did at the time, and secondly because of the absence of roof-mounted television antennas due to most of the homes having cable television. Because of the large bluffs, over-the-air television signals had problems reaching homes in the low-lying areas, so a cable system was developed in the mid-1950s, which was considerably earlier than many other municipalities.

Some locations used in filming included St. Raphael's Cathedral, Sacred Heart Church, the Fourth Street Elevator, E.J. Voggenthaler Co. and Dubuque Star Brewery. Filming was also done at the former Caradco manufacturing company in Dubuque. Portions of the Caradco building were fitted with new windows which were then purposely smashed for filming.  The windows were replaced by the end of filming. Other Dubuque locations that were also visible in the finished film were the Dubuque County Courthouse and Saint Mary's Catholic Church.

Some filming was also done in the English city of Sheffield, Washington D.C., and Culver City Studios.

Release

Theatrical
The film premiered as the Gala Opening Night film at Filmex on April 13, 1978, at the Plitt Theatre in Century City and was released in 100 theaters in the United States and Canada on April 26, 1978, before expanding to 350 on June 21.

Reception

Box office
The film was a success, grossing $20,388,920 on an $8 million budget, though it was not as successful as Stallone's previous film Rocky (1976).

Critical response
F.I.S.T. received generally positive reviews from film critics. Vincent Canby of The New York Times gave the film three-and-a-half stars out of five, stating "F.I.S.T. is a big movie that benefits from the accumulating of small, ordinary detail than from any particular wit or inspiration of vision." Another positive review came from TV Guide, which gave the film three stars out of four. They praised Stallone's script and acting, saying that "Stallone likes to depart himself from his muscles, it usually doesn't work. But, with F.I.S.T. it works well as he cares more about the character than anything else, something we'd like to see more of."

A negative review came from Richard Schickel of Time magazine, who said that the film "stands for nearly  hours of almost unmitigated boredom—a misfired would-be proletarian epic with Sylvester Stallone misplaying the Jimmy Hoffa part with a self-confidence that borders on the sublime."

The film holds an 73% "Fresh" score on Rotten Tomatoes based on 11 reviews.

Notes

External links

 30th Anniversary Celebration of F.I.S.T. at Carnegie-Stout Public Library in Dubuque, Iowa
 
 
 
 

1978 films
1978 drama films
American drama films
Culture of Dubuque, Iowa
Films scored by Bill Conti
Films directed by Norman Jewison
Films set in Cleveland
Films set in the 1930s
Films set in the 1950s
Films shot in England
Films shot in Wisconsin
Films about the labor movement
Films about the working class
Films with screenplays by Joe Eszterhas
Films with screenplays by Sylvester Stallone
Trucker films
United Artists films
Films shot in Iowa
Films à clef
Films shot in Washington, D.C.
Films shot in California
Films shot in South Yorkshire
1970s English-language films
Jimmy Hoffa
1970s American films